The 1993–94 Liverpool F.C. season was the 102nd season in the club's existence, and their 32nd consecutive year in the top-flight.

Manager Graeme Souness resigned on 29 January 1994 after just under three years in charge following a shock FA Cup exit at the hands of Bristol City, and he was succeeded by long serving coach Roy Evans, who guided the Reds to eighth place in the final table.

The season began with the arrival of two notable new players, striker Nigel Clough and defender Neil Ruddock. A month into the season, Liverpool signed defender Julian Dicks from West Ham United, with defender David Burrows and midfielder Mike Marsh heading to East London as part of the deal. January saw the departure of striker Ronny Rosenthal to Tottenham Hotspur. It was the last season at Anfield for long-serving goalkeeper Bruce Grobbelaar and midfielder Ronnie Whelan, who had both been at the club for well over a decade and signed for Southampton and Southend United respectively. Less high-profile departure during and after the season were midfielder Don Hutchison, defender Torben Piechnik and goalkeeper Mike Hooper.

Teenage striker Robbie Fowler made his debut early in the season and scored all five goals in a League Cup tie against Fulham in one of his first senior games, and by the end of the season had scored 12 goals in the league and 18 in all competitions to oust Nigel Clough as the regular partner of Ian Rush.

The famous Spion Kop was demolished at the end of the season to make way for a new all-seater stand as Premier League clubs had to have all-seater stadiums for the 1994–95 season in line with the Taylor Report.

This season covered the period from 1 July 1993 to 30 June 1994.

Players

First-team squad

Left club during season

Reserve squad

Youth squad

Transfers

In

Out

Loaned in

Competitions

Premier League

League table

Matches

FA Cup

Matches

 1  Game re-arranged from 8 January; original tie abandoned due to floodlight failure

League Cup

Matches

Statistics

Goalscorers

Competition top scorers

Events of the season

August
After Paul Stewart's first season at Anfield had been plagued by injury and loss of form, manager Graeme Souness paid £2.275 million for Nottingham Forest striker Nigel Clough as strike-partner to Ian Rush in hope of getting Liverpool challenging for the title again. He also boosted the centre of defence with a £2.5 million move for Tottenham Hotspur's Neil Ruddock.

Clough made an excellent start to his Liverpool career, scoring two goals on his debut against Sheffield Wednesday in a 2–0 home win on the opening day of the Premier League season. He was also on the scoresheet (along with Ian Rush and Steve Nicol) four days later when the Reds beat Queens Park Rangers 3–1 at Loftus Road. Liverpool recorded a three-match winning start to the season on 22 August when they crushed newly promoted Swindon Town 5–0 at the County Ground. Steve McManaman was on target twice, with the other goals coming from Neil Ruddock, Ronnie Whelan and Mike Marsh. There was a setback three days later when Liverpool were beaten 2–1 at home by Tottenham, but the month ended on a winning note with a 2–0 home win over Leeds United. The Reds were now second behind Manchester United (the defending champions) in the Premier League, and manager Graeme Souness was hopeful of saving his job by bringing the league title back to Anfield sooner rather than later.

September
After an excellent August, the Reds fell to earth in September as all four of their Premier League games ended in defeat at the hands of Blackburn Rovers at Anfield, Coventry City at Highfield Road, Everton at Goodison Park and Chelsea at Stamford Bridge. This dragged the Reds from second to 13th place in the Premier League.

The only positive note that month came in the Football League Cup second-round first leg at Craven Cottage, in which the Reds beat Fulham 3–1, with Ian Rush and Nigel Clough getting on the scoresheet along with 18-year-old Robbie Fowler, who scored his first goal for the club.

September saw the arrival at Anfield of West Ham United defender Julian Dicks, who was signed in part exchange for David Burrows and Mike Marsh.

October
The Reds pulled together after a disastrous September, holding Arsenal to a goalless draw at Anfield before overcoming Oldham Athletic at Anfield to win 2–1; Robbie Fowler scored his first league goal in that match. The next game saw the Reds draw 1–1 with Manchester City at Maine Road, before the month ended on a high note with a 4–2 home win over Southampton; Robbie Fowler scored a hat-trick.

Fowler had been spectacular earlier in the month by scoring all five goals against Fulham in the return leg of the League Cup second round at Anfield. Before the month was out, the Reds eliminated Ipswich Town in the third round at Anfield with Ian Rush scoring a hat-trick.

The Reds were now seventh in the table, but 13 points behind leaders Manchester United, who had built up an 11-point lead over nearest contenders Norwich City and Arsenal.

November
The Reds saw league action just three times in November, first in a 2–0 home win over West Ham followed by a 3–0 defeat at Newcastle United (inspired by former Liverpool players Barry Venison and Peter Beardsley) before the month ended with a 2–1 home win over Aston Villa, in which rising stars Robbie Fowler and Jamie Redknapp were on the scoresheet.

Liverpool were now ninth in the league and the pressure was building back up on Graeme Souness.

December
December was a tough month for the Reds, increasing speculation that Graeme Souness was about to leave or be forced out of the manager's seat.

The month began badly with a 3–1 defeat at Sheffield Wednesday, though four days later the Reds regrouped to beat QPR 3–2 at Anfield. They were then held to a disappointing 2–2 draw at Anfield by bottom club Swindon Town. A week late came a pulsating 3–3 draw with Tottenham at White Hart Lane. Boxing Day saw a disappointing goalless draw with Sheffield United at Bramall Lane, and the last game of the year was a 1–1 home draw with Wimbledon.

The League Cup run ended at Selhurst Park when Wimbledon defeated the Reds on penalties after a 2–2 draw in the replay, having held them to a 1–1 draw in the first match at Anfield.

Liverpool ended 1993 in eighth place, 20 points adrift of leaders Manchester United though only six points adrift of third place and European qualification.

January
1994 began with a 2–1 win for the Reds against Ipswich at Portman Road, and three days later they came from three goals down to draw 3–3 at home to Manchester United in which Nigel Clough (struggling to stay in the first team following the emergence of Robbie Fowler) scored twice. The next league game saw a 3–0 away win of relegation-threatened Oldham at Boundary Park, before two Ian Rush goals disposed of Manchester City 2–1 at Anfield. The FA Cup quest began at Ashton Gate on 19 January, in which the Reds held Bristol City to a 1–1 draw. They were expected to triumph in the replay at Anfield six days later, but the West Country side pulled off a major shock to win 1–0, prompting Souness' resignation three days later. Long-serving coach and former player Roy Evans was appointed as his successor.

Liverpool now stood fifth in the league. With Manchester United now looking uncatchable at the top of the table, the best Evans could hope for on his arrival at Anfield was to guide Liverpool into one of the two UEFA Cup places.

February
Roy Evans had a difficult first month as Liverpool manager. His first game was a 2–2 draw at Norwich City (who had recently lost manager Mike Walker to Everton), followed by a 4-2 demolition by Southampton, who were fighting relegation. Then came another defeat, this time at the hands of Leeds, who triumphed 2–0 at Elland Road. The first win for Evans came at the end of the month when an early goal from Ian Rush gave them a 1–0 win over Coventry City at Anfield. Liverpool ended the month still in fifth place, four points shy of third place and UEFA Cup qualification.

March
March was a mixed month for the Reds, who began it with a 2–0 defeat at Kenny Dalglish's Blackburn Rovers, who were hoping to overhaul Manchester United with late run for the title. Then came a 2–1 home win over Everton in the Merseyside derby, in which Ian Rush and Robbie Fowler scored. A 2–1 home win over Chelsea at Anfield followed, but the month ended on a low note with away defeats to Arsenal and then Manchester United which left the Reds sixth and looking increasingly unlikely to qualify for the UEFA Cup.

April
April was another mixed month for the Reds, who managed to beat Ipswich and West Ham, but were beaten by Sheffield United, Newcastle and Norwich and held to a draw by Wimbledon. With one game to go, Liverpool had slipped to eighth place and were on course for one of their lowest league finishes since promotion in 1962.

May
The league campaign ended with a 2–1 defeat by Aston Villa, consigning the Reds to a lowly eighth-place finish. Robbie Fowler scored their only goal, bringing his league tally for his first season in the first team to 12 goals, with 18 in all competitions.

1993-94 was the last season at Anfield for veteran players Bruce Grobbelaar and Ronnie Whelan, who moved on to new clubs as their professional careers approached their end.

Notes

References

External links
LFC History 1993-94 Season

Liverpool F.C. seasons
Liverpool F.C.